Turrill is a surname. Notable people with the surname include:

Joel Turrill (1794–1859), American politician
Simon Turrill (born 1962), English cricketer
William Bertram Turrill (1890–1961), English botanist

See also
Richard Turrill McMullen (1830–1891), British yachtsman